PictureBox is a video on demand film service offering a selection of films and TV series carried within monthly SVOD subscriptions. It launched in 2006 and has been available as a separate subscription through several Digital TV service providers in selected countries such as United Kingdom, Russia, Romania and Central and Latin America (Mexico, Colombia and Brazil). PictureBox was the first only wholly owned SVOD (subscription video on demand service) operated by NBCUniversal. 
PictureBox currently operates in Russia and CIS.

Business model 
PictureBox differentiates itself from other subscription video on demand services by offering subscribers a 'hand-picked' selection of films and TV series, which are rotated each month. Users do not pay per film or series; for a monthly subscription they have access to any available films and TV series and can watch these titles as many times as they choose.

PictureBox digital TV service

Russia & CIS 
In Russia, PictureBox is available through the providers Rostelecom, IVI, KION and Okko. In Ukraine, PictureBox is available through the providers Sweet TV and MEGOGO.

References

External links 
 

NBCUniversal
Video on demand services